Abalı may refer to:

 Abalı, Ağaçören, a village in the district of Ağaçören, Aksaray Province, Turkey
 Abalı, Lice
 Abalı, Zaqatala, a village in the municipality of Maqov, Zaqatala Rayon, Azerbaijan